Pseudancistrus corantijniensis is a species of catfish in the family Loricariidae. It is native to South America, where it occurs in the Courantyne River in Suriname. The species reaches 17.9 cm (7 inches) SL, and it is named for the Courantyne (also known as the Corantijn, which is the spelling from which its name is derived), which is its only known habitat. 

It was described in 2008 by Sophie de Chambrier and Juan I. Montoya-Burgos (of the University of Geneva) based on a morphological and molecular analysis.

References 

Loricariidae
Fish described in 2008